Rebecca Bellingham (born Gordon on 7 March 1978 in Auckland, New Zealand) is a female badminton player from New Zealand.

At the 2002 Commonwealth Games she won a bronze medal in the mixed team event. She played at the 2005 World Badminton Championships in Anaheim and reached the third round, but lost to Tracey Hallam of England (7–11, 10–13).

Following her defeat, she has pursued a career in teaching and is known to be teaching at North Sydney Boys High School.

References

New Zealand female badminton players
Commonwealth Games bronze medallists for New Zealand
Badminton players at the 1998 Commonwealth Games
Badminton players at the 2002 Commonwealth Games
Badminton players at the 2006 Commonwealth Games
1978 births
Living people
Commonwealth Games medallists in badminton
20th-century New Zealand women
Medallists at the 2002 Commonwealth Games